Surrey-White Rock-Cloverdale was a provincial electoral district in the Canadian province of British Columbia in 1986 only.  The riding's predecessor was the Surrey riding, which first appeared in the 1966 election.  Its successor ridings were Surrey-Newton, Surrey-White Rock and Surrey-Cloverdale.

For other historical and current ridings in Vancouver or the North Shore see Vancouver (electoral districts).  For other Greater Vancouver area ridings please see New Westminster (electoral districts).

Electoral history 

 
 

The population boom in Surrey saw Surrey further redistributed after 1986.

References

Sources 
 Elections BC Historical Returns

Former provincial electoral districts of British Columbia
Politics of Surrey, British Columbia
White Rock, British Columbia